Aphelia caucasica is a species of moth of the family Tortricidae. It is found in Russia, where it has been recorded from the Caucasus.

References

Moths described in 1975
Aphelia (moth)
Moths of Asia
Moths of Europe